Yuxarı Buzqov (also, Yukhari-Buzgov and Yukhary Buzgov) is a village and municipality in the Babek District of Nakhchivan, Azerbaijan.  It has a population of 154.

References 

Populated places in Babek District